Prosopis humilis, the algarrobilla or algaroba (carob in Spanish), is a mesquite, a flowering plant and a tree species in the genus Prosopis found in Argentina.

It is placed in subfamily Caesalpinioideae.

See also
 Prosopis algarrobilla, a synonym for Prosopis nigra

References

External links

 Algarrobilla on www.invasive.org

humilis